Protein KIAA1958 is a protein that in humans is encoded by the KIAA1958 gene. Orthologs of KIAA1958 go as far back in evolution to  chordates, although, it is closer in homology to primates than any other orthologs. KIAA1958 has no known paralogs.

Gene 
KIAA1958 is located on the long arm of chromosome 9 (9.q32) in humans on the plus strand from 115249248 to 115427597.  Its mRNA has 2683 bp. The gene has these neighbors on chromosome 9:

HSDL2: Hydroxysteroid dehydrogenase-like protein 2 plays a role in nucleotide binding, oxidoreductase activity, and sterol binding.

C9orf147: Chromosome 9 open reading frame 147 has an unknown function.

C9orf80: Chromosome 9 open reading frame 80 is a component of the SOSS complex, a multiprotein complex that functions downstream of the MRN complex to promote DNA repair and G2/M checkpoint. The SOSS complex associates with single-stranded DNA at DNA lesions and influences diverse endpoints in the cellular DNA damage response including cell cycle checkpoint activation, recombinational repair and maintenance of genomic stability.

SNX30: Sorting nexin-30 may be linked to phosphatidylinositol binding.

Expression 

KIAA1958 is expressed in the highest quantities in the larynx as proposed by EST.  The highest expression in developmental stage is the blastocyst and for health state, it is most found in uterine tumors.
Data from NCBI GEO Profile shows that KIAA1958 expression includes many of the tissue types in the human body. Using EMBL-EBI, KIAA1958 was found to be overexpressed in pseudopod RNA during the migration of the metastatic cancer cells.  KIAA1958 was also overexpressed in Stat5/ab  and stat 3 which are transcription factors reported to be critical for the growth and viability of prostate cancer cells and both the embryonic stem cell and the pluripotent stem cell.

Protein 

KIAA1958 is composed of 716 amino acids and weighs 79212 Da with an iso-electric point of 6.375.  Although not much is known about the KIAA1958 protein, scientific predictions have been made using supercomputers for predictions of KIAA1958's structure and function. KIAA1958 undergoes post-translational modifications. The most interesting modification is phosphorylation. In comparison to other proteins, KIAA1958 has a substantially significant amount of serines phosphorylated during post-translational modification. 36 serines are predicted to be phosphorylated.

Structure 

PELE on SDSC Biology WorkBench is supercomputer that is able to predict secondary structure of the KIAA1958 protein. According to this tool, the protein's secondary structure is a combination of alpha helices and beta sheets, in almost equal amount and spread out almost evenly throughout the protein.

Interactions 
There is no known proof that KIAA1958 interacts with any other proteins at this time.

Homology

References

Further reading